Rebecca Judith Ish-Kishor (25 March 1892 – 1971) was an American writer of Jewish children's historical fiction.

She was born in Boston in 1892, the daughter of Zionist leader . She was raised in London before returning to the U.S. to study at Hunter College in New York. She is best known for her works Adventure in Palestine: The Search for Aleezah (1947), Joel is the Youngest (1954), and Tales From the Wise Men of Israel (1962). She also wrote a popular column for Jewish children in the English-language Jewish press, entitled The Sabbath Angel.

Her sister, Sulamith Ish-Kishor, was also a prominent children's writer.

Publications
 
 
 
  Illustrated by Theresa Sherman.
  Illustrated by Margaret Ayer.
  Illustrated by Jules Gotlieb.
  Illustrated by W. T. Mars.

References

1892 births
1971 deaths
American women children's writers
Hunter College alumni
Jewish women writers
Writers from Boston